Christ the King, often simply referred to as CtK is a Catholic secondary school in Georgetown, Ontario, Canada. The school was established and began classes in September 2002. Its students are required to wear school uniforms. The school competes in the Golden Horseshoe Halton Sports Division, and their teams are known as the Jaguars. The Jaguars quickly developed a strong rivalry with the Georgetown District High School 87's (GDHS).  CtK began Specialist High Skills Major Programs in the Arts, Phys Ed., and Information Technology in 2009.

Facilities
Christ the King features:
 Vocal and instrumental Music rooms
 Dance studio
 Dramatic Arts Studio
 A 350-seat theatre
 Weight room
 Artificial turf field and track
 Three connected gymnasiums
 Food & nutrition room
 Cosmetology Lab
 Automotive Shop
 Construction Technology
 The Mole King's Computer Classes

Arts program
Christ the King as a secondary school is known for its arts program, starting its Specialist High Skills Major Arts Program in 2009. Classes include visual, musical (vocal & instrumental), dramatic arts (including dance), as well as musical theatre. Christ the King has also put on a number of theatrical productions. In more recent years CtK has chosen musicals such as Annie, Grease, and Little Shop rather than plays.

The Irene McCauley Theatre for the Performing Arts

The Irene McCauley Theatre is where CtK's theatrical productions are held.  Christ the King was built with a live performance theatre consisting of approximately 350 seats, although seats can be removed or added to meet a productions' needs. In 2007, the theatre's name was changed in honour of Irene McCauley, a former trustee of the Halton Catholic District School Board, at which she worked for 26 years.

Feeder schools
Holy Cross
St. Brigid
St. Catherine of Alexandria
St. Francis of Assisi
St. Joseph'sIOI
Halton Hills Christian School
Sacre-Coeur

See also
List of high schools in Ontario
Georgetown District High School

References

External links
Christ the King website
Halton Catholic School Board Official Website

High schools in the Regional Municipality of Halton
Catholic secondary schools in Ontario
Halton Hills
Educational institutions established in 2002
2002 establishments in Ontario